Schwartzmann is a surname, and may refer to:
 Leon Schwartzmann (1887–1942), a Polish–French chess master
 Paulette Schwartzmann, a French–Argentine chess player

See also
 Schwartzman
 Schwarzmann
 Schwarzman

German-language surnames
Jewish surnames